James or Jim Bishop may refer to:

James Bishop (artist) (1927–2021), American painter
James Bishop (colonial administrator) (1625–1691), early English colonial administrator of Connecticut
James Bishop (congressman) (1816–1895), New Jersey congressman
James Bishop (diplomat) (born 1938), American diplomat
James Bishop (rugby union), Scottish rugby union player
James Chapman Bishop (1783–1854), British organ manufacturer
James Cunningham Bishop (1870–1932), American banker
Jamie Bishop (1971–2007), German language instructor and Virginia Tech shooting victim
Jamie Bishop (cricketer) (1971–2015), Welsh cricket player
Jim Bishop (1907–1987), American journalist
Jim Bishop (baseball) (1898–1973), Major League Baseball pitcher
Jim Bishop (bishop) (1908–1994), English bishop
Jim Bishop (doctor), Australian doctor, Chief Medical Officer of Australia 2009–2011